Luis Antonio Santiago de Cuadra y Raoul, 2nd Marqués de Guadalmina (28 May 1847 – 21 December 1921) was a Spanish equestrian. He competed in the equestrian mail coach event at the 1900 Summer Olympics.

References

1847 births
1921 deaths
Spanish male equestrians
Olympic equestrians of Spain
Equestrians at the 1900 Summer Olympics
Sportspeople from Guatemala City
Place of death missing